Flo Tsai Huang-ru (born 15 November 1987) is a Taiwanese actress, singer and television host. She made her television debut as a host of the long-running video gaming show GameGX. She has since appeared in several films and television series, including K Song Lover (2013), Crime Scene Investigation Center (2015), Back to 1989 (2016), The Masked Lover (2017) and Young Days No Fears (2020).

Filmography

Television series

Film

Variety show

Music video

Discography

Studio albums

Extended plays

Soundtrack albums

Published works

Awards and nominations

References

External links

 
 
 

1987 births
Living people
Taiwanese television actresses
Taiwanese film actresses
21st-century Taiwanese actresses
Actresses from New Taipei
21st-century Taiwanese singers
Taiwanese Mandopop singers
Taiwanese television presenters
21st-century Taiwanese women singers
Musicians from New Taipei
Taiwanese women television presenters
Hsing Wu University alumni